The men's individual archery competition at the 2012 Olympic Games in London was held from 27 July to 3 August at Lord's Cricket Ground.

Oh Jin-Hyek of South Korea won the gold medal, followed by Takaharu Furukawa from Japan with silver and Dai Xiaoxiang, representing China, with the bronze.

Competition format
The competitors were ranked 1st to 64th based on their ranking round results and seeded into a head-to-head knock-out bracket based on this ranking. The 2012 Olympics introduced a new format for the knockout rounds. Each head-to-head match was a best-of-five sets match where each competitor shoots three arrows per set. Competitors received two points for winning the set and one point for a draw with the first competitor to reach six points winning the match. The winner advanced to the next round while the loser was eliminated from the competition.

Schedule
All times are British Summer Time (UTC+1).

Records
Prior to this competition, the existing world and Olympic records were as follows.  Im Dong-Hyun broke both records.

72 arrow ranking round

NB: Im Dong-Hyun broke the world record at the 2004 Olympics with a score of 687. It was not recognized by the International Olympic Committee as an Olympic record because the ranking round took place on 12 August, before the 2004 opening ceremony.  Im's 2012 ranking round score is recognized as an Olympic record, despite having been shot before the opening ceremony.

Results

Ranking round

Competition bracket

Section 1

Section 2

Section 3

Section 4

Finals

References

Archery at the 2012 Summer Olympics
Men's events at the 2012 Summer Olympics